Shengavit, is a Yerevan Metro station. It was opened to public on December 26, 1985. Located on Soghomon Tarontsi street within the Artur Karapetyan park, the station serves the Shengavit District.

Shengavit station connects the Gortsaranain station with the Garegin Nzhdeh station. There is also a secondary line that connects Shengavit with the Charbakh station.

Gallery

References

Yerevan Metro stations
Railway stations opened in 1985
1985 establishments in Armenia